Moscheles is a surname. Notable people with the surname include:

 Felix Moscheles (1833–1917), English painter, writer, and peace advocate
 Gary Moscheles (born 1971), alias of English electronic musician Mike Paradinas
 Ignaz Moscheles (1794–1870), Bohemian composer and pianist